Lori Goldstein is an American fashion stylist, editor, designer of LOGO by Lori Goldstein for QVC, and author of 'Lori Goldstein: Style Is Instinct'. She has frequently collaborated with photographers Steven Meisel and Annie Leibovitz, creating well-known ad campaigns and editorials. She was also the first agency-signed stylist, signing with Art + Commerce, now a division of IMG.

Life & Career 

Goldstein was born in Columbus, Ohio and got her first fashion job working at Fred Segal in Los Angeles. While accompanying Segal on a buying trip to New York, she decided to move to New York City to launch her fashion career. She then started her editorial work at Vanity Fair and Allure magazine, as well as collaborating with Annie Leibovitz on a series of GAP and American Express ad campaigns and beginning her partnership with Steven Meisel on a number of projects, including their Valley of the Dolls-inspired ad for Versace.
Goldstein has since gone on to work with noted photographers such as Richard Avedon, Bruce Weber, Peter Lindbergh, Mario Testino, Herb Ritts, Craig McDean, Patrick Demarchelier, Hedi Slimane, Glen Luchford, Mario Sorrenti, Solve Sundsbo, Ellen Von Unwerth, Inez and Vinoodh, Steven Klein, Michael Thompson, Paolo Roversi, Arthur Elgort, and Yelena Yemchuk.

She has styled campaigns for high-end brands such as Prada, Dolce & Gabbana, Hermès, Tiffany & Co, Versace, Elie Tahari, Fendi, Yves Saint Laurent, Vera Wang, BCBG Max Azria, Roberto Cavalli, Harry Winston, Burberry, Nina Ricci (brand) and Valentino. She has also held contributing editor positions at Elle Magazine, W Magazine, Vogue Italia, Vogue Nippon and has styled editorials for Harper's Bazaar, i-D, Vogue China, German Vogue, and the Los Angeles Times Magazine.

Lori Goldstein has worked extensively with Mario Testino, her former roommate, styling Madonna's 1995 Versace ads, Ray of Light and Something to Remember albums, all photographed by Testino. Goldstein received the VH1 Fashion and Media award for best styling of Madonna's "Take A Bow" music video. She has also worked with various entertainers and notable figures such as Michael Jackson, Angelina Jolie, Cate Blanchett, Diana Ross, Julianne Moore, Ella Fitzgerald, Ellen DeGeneres, Sophia Loren, Beyoncé, Raquel Welch, Britney Spears, Scarlett Johansson, Sarah Jessica Parker, Nicole Kidman, Ray Charles, Johnny Depp, Sammy Davis Jr., Demi Moore, Rihanna, Julia Roberts, Drew Barrymore, among many others.

QVC 

LOGO by Lori Goldstein debuted on QVC in 2009, when the network teamed up with Mercedes-Benz Fashion Week. The line covers apparel, jewelry, footwear, eyewear, and home decor items, offered at an affordable price. In 2014, the brand was awarded 'Apparel Product Concept of the Year' and Goldstein named QVC Ambassador. In 2015, LOGO was allotted a regular Monday primetime show on QVC as well as an afternoon edition show on Thursdays.

References 

Year of birth missing (living people)
Living people
American fashion journalists
American fashion designers
American women fashion designers
Artists from Columbus, Ohio
QVC people
Journalists from Ohio
21st-century American women